Cole Deggs & the Lonesome is the only studio album by American country music band Cole Deggs & the Lonesome. It was released on July 10, 2007 via Columbia Records. The album includes the singles "I Got More" and "Girl Next Door".

Critical reception

Giving it three-and-a-half stars out of five, Thom Jurek of Allmusic said that it was "a promising first set by a band with a unique sound; they can sing, write, arrange, and play the hell out of their instruments while being uniquely themselves." Jeffrey B. Remz of Country Standard Time was less favorable, calling the band's harmonies "workmanlike" and the songwriting "predictable". He thought that the song "I Haven't Stopped Hurtin'" was the best song on the album because the band "cut loose" on it.

Track listing

Personnel

Cole Deggs & The Lonesome
Cole Deggs – lead vocals, acoustic guitar
Shade Deggs – bass guitar, background vocals
Brian Hayes – drums
David Wallace – electric guitar, background vocals
Jimmy Wallace – keyboards, Hammond organ, background vocals

Additional musicians
Matt Chamberlain – drums
Lisa Cochran – background vocals
Perry Coleman – background vocals
Eric Darken – percussion
Kenny Greenberg  – electric guitar
Mark Hill – bass guitar
Jim Hoke – harmonica
Tim Lauer – accordion
Chuck Leavell – piano, Wurlitzer electric piano, Hammond organ
Russ Pahl – acoustic guitar, electric guitar, steel guitar
Kim Parent – background vocals
Rivers Rutherford – acoustic guitar, background vocals
John Wesley Ryles – background vocals
Russell Terrell – background vocals
 John Willis — acoustic guitar, banjo
Christian Wojcik - background vocals

Singles

References

2007 debut albums
Columbia Records albums
Cole Deggs & the Lonesome albums
Albums produced by Mark Wright (record producer)